Vesyoly is a rural locality (a khutor) in Staroanninskoye Rural Settlement, Novoanninsky District, Volgograd Oblast, Russia. The population was 77 as of 2010.

Geography 
Vesyoly is located in forest steppe on the Volga Upland, 10 km southwest of Novoanninsky (the district's administrative centre) by road. Rodnikovsky is the nearest rural locality.

References 

Rural localities in Novoanninsky District